The Climax is a 1930 American thriller film directed by Renaud Hoffman and written by Lillian Ducey, Julien Josephson, Leslie Mason and Clarence Thompson. The film is adapted from the play of the same name by Edward Locke. The Climax stars Jean Hersholt, Kathryn Crawford, LeRoy Mason, John Reinhardt and Henry Armetta. The film was released on January 26, 1930, by Universal Pictures.

Cast
Jean Hersholt as Luigi Golfanti
Kathryn Crawford as Adella Golfanti
LeRoy Mason as Dr. Gardoni
John Reinhardt as Pietro Golfanti
Henry Armetta as Anton Donatelli

References

Citations

Sources

External links 
 

1930 films
1930s English-language films
American thriller films
1930s thriller films
Universal Pictures films
American black-and-white films
Films directed by Renaud Hoffman
1930s American films